Atolia is a ghost town in the Mojave Desert near Randsburg, in northwestern San Bernardino County, California.

History
It was at the site of a tungsten mine that started production about 1905. The community was named after two mining company officials, Atkins and DeGolia. At one time there were 2000 people living there. 

Atolia was on the Randsburg Railway line. There was once a dairy, a movie theater, and the Bucket of Blood saloon. But, commercial operations have been abandoned.

External links
Atolia at High Desert Memories dot com
Tungsten mining at Atolia
Information on the city of Atolia

Former settlements in San Bernardino County, California
Ghost towns in California
Populated places in the Mojave Desert